Sura or Soura was a town of ancient Lycia, noted for its oracle of Apollo.

Its site is located near Yuva Koyu in modern Asiatic Turkey.

References

Populated places in ancient Lycia
Former populated places in Turkey
Ancient Greek archaeological sites in Turkey